The Pam Islands are an island group of the Admiralty Islands archipelago in the Bismarck Sea, within Papua New Guinea.

They are located to the south of Manus Island, to the south-west of Lou Island. The main island is Baluan Island, heavily forested, which has a settlement called Mouk on its northern coast.

The Baluan-Pam language is spoken here.

References

Archipelagoes of Papua New Guinea
Admiralty Islands